Bang Bang Ball is an arcade game released by Banpresto in 1996. Skateboarding mice must throw colored balls against clusters of moving balls, while avoiding being hit by any of the balls. A thrown ball hitting one or more balls of the same colour causes them to disappear.  Special balls have special effects such as exploding nearby balls or temporarily immobilizing the balls.

References

External links

Bang Bang Ball at Arcade History.

1996 video games
Arcade video games
Arcade-only video games
Banpresto games
Video games developed in Japan